The Red brotula (Brosmophycis marginata) is a species of viviparous brotula found along the North American Pacific coast from Alaska to Baja California.  This fish is often displayed in public aquariums.  This species grows to a length of  TL.  The red brotula is the only known member of its genus.

References
 

Bythitidae
Monotypic fish genera
Fish described in 1854